Sora is a town and comune of Lazio, Italy, in the province of Frosinone. It is built in a plain on the banks of the Liri. This part of the valley is the seat of some important manufacturing, especially of paper mills. The area around Sora is famous for the costumes of its peasants.

History

Sora, an ancient Volscian town, was thrice captured by the Romans, in 345, 314, and 305 BCE, before they managed, in 303, by means of a colony 4,000 strong, to confirm its annexation as a Latin colony. In 209, it was one of the colonies that refused further contributions to the war against Hannibal. By the lex Julia, it became a municipium, but under Augustus, it was colonized by soldiers of the legio IV Sorana, which had been mainly enrolled there. It belonged technically to Latium adiectum.

Located in the Ducatus Romanus under the authority of the pope during the early Dark Ages, it was captured by the Lombards of Gisulf I of Benevento in 705.

The castle of Sorella, built on the rocky height above the town, was in the Middle Ages a stronghold of some note. In 1229, during the War of the Keys, it submitted to the Papacy and was then sacked by the Emperor Frederick II, its inhabitants hanged. In 1443, King Alfonso of Naples made Sora the seat of an independent Duchy; it was afterwards seized by Pope Pius II, but being restored to the Cantelmi by Pope Sixtus IV, it ultimately passed to the duke Giovanni Della Rovere. Against Cesare Borgia, the city was heroically defended by Francesco Maria I Della Rovere. It was purchased by Pope Gregory XIII for 11,000 ducats and bestowed under the suzerainty of Gregory's son, Giacomo Boncompagni (who was the first duke of Sora of the family).

Geography
The distance from Sora to centre of Rome is 115 km; heading in the opposite direction, the downtown area of Naples is 138 km from Sora.

The municipality, located next to Abruzzo, borders with Arpino, Balsorano (AQ), Broccostella, Campoli Appennino, Castelliri, Isola del Liri, Monte San Giovanni Campano, Pescosolido, and Veroli.

Main sights
The original cathedral, consecrated by Pope Adrian IV in 1155, was destroyed by the earthquake of 1634.

Above the town on a precipitous rock, elevation , that guards the Liri's valley and the entrance to the Abruzzi are remains of polygonal walls; here, possibly, was the citadel of the original Volscian town. Also, remains of medieval fortifications are there.

Among the churches in town are the Sanctuary of the Madonna della Figura and San Silvestro Papa.

Notable people
 Suranus
 Caesar Baronius
 Luca Brandolini
 Ludovico Camangi
 Vittorio Cristini
 Alfredo De Gasperis
 Vittorio De Sica
 Enzo Di Pede
 Tony Evangelista
 Alessio Giustini
 Filippo Iannone
 Lucius Mummius
 Stefano Pescosolido
 Giulio Polerio
 Quintus Valerius Soranus
 Anna Tatangelo
 Zappacosta
 Davide Zappacosta

Twin towns
 Vaughan, Canada
 Athis-Mons, France

References

External links

Official website  
 

 
Cities and towns in Lazio
Roman sites in Lazio
Sorella